Adobe Inc. is an American computer software company headquartered in San Jose, California. In 1982, John Warnock and Charles Geschke left Xerox PARC and established Adobe to develop and sell the PostScript page description language. Apple Computer licensed PostScript in 1985 for use in its LaserWriter printers, which helped spark the desktop publishing revolution. The company has acquired 25 companies, purchased stakes in five, and divested six, most of which were software companies. Of the companies that Adobe has acquired, 18 were based in the United States. Adobe has not released the financial details for most of these mergers and acquisitions.

Adobe's first acquisition was Emerald City Software in March 1990. In August 1994, the company acquired Aldus Corporation, a Seattle-based software company credited with creating the desktop publishing industry with its PageMaker software. The company's products were integrated into Adobe's product line later in the year, and re-branded as Adobe PageMaker and Adobe After Effects; Aldus also owned the TIFF file format, transferring ownership to Adobe. In October 1995, Adobe acquired the desktop publishing software company Frame Technology for US$566 million, and re-branded its FrameMaker software to Adobe FrameMaker. Adobe acquired GoLive Systems in January 1999 and obtained its CyberStudio HTML editor software, releasing it as Adobe GoLive. In May 2003, Adobe acquired Syntrillium Software and its digital audio editor software Cool Edit Pro, and merged it into its product line, re-releasing it as Adobe Audition.

In the 1990s, Adobe purchased a minority stake in four companies, and it purchased a stake in one company in the 2000s. Adobe has also divested six companies, in which parts of the company are sold to another company. All of its divestments were made in the 1990s, with its most recent divestment made in August 1999 when it sold Macromedia Pathware to Lotus Software.

Acquisitions

Indirect acquisitions
Adobe also owns the assets of numerous companies, through less direct means, through the mergers or acquisitions of companies later acquired by Adobe.

 Company of Science and Art (CoSA)
Acquired by Aldus
Allaire Corporation
Acquired by Macromedia
Live Software
Acquired by Allaire Corporation
Authorware Inc
Merged to form Macromedia
MacroMind
Merged to form MacroMind-Paracomp
Paracomp
Merged to form MacroMind-Paracomp
Altsys
Acquired by Macromedia
MacroMind-Paracomp
Merged to form Macromedia
iBand Software
Acquired by Macromedia
FutureWave Software
Acquired by Macromedia
Andromedia Corporation
Acquired by Macromedia
Presedia
Acquired by Macromedia
eHelp Corporation
Acquired by Macromedia
nHabit.com
Merged with GoodHome.com (Scene7)
Engage
Assets acquired by Scene7
Cascade
Acquired by Scene7
MidSystems
Acquired by Scene7
TrueSpectra
Acquired by Scene7
Touch Clarity
Acquired by Omniture
Visual Sciences, Inc. (formerly WebSideStory)
Acquired by Omniture
Offermatica
Acquired by Omniture
Mercado
Acquired by Omniture
Context Optional
Acquired by Efficient Frontier
Wrike***

Stakes

Divestitures

Notes

See also 
 List of largest mergers and acquisitions
 Lists of corporate acquisitions and mergers

References

External links
 Adobe
 Clipping Path
 Information Technology

Adobe
Adobe Inc.